PaintCare, Inc. is a non-profit product stewardship organization created by the American Coatings Association to administer paint stewardship programs. In states that pass paint stewardship laws PaintCare establishes drop-off locations where the public can dispose of leftover paint for recycling, re-use, or other appropriate management. It is headquartered in Washington, D.C.

History 
PaintCare was formed to manage the first U.S. paint stewardship program that began in Oregon in July 2010. Since then the program has also been established in California, Colorado, Connecticut, the District of Columbia, Maine, Minnesota, Rhode Island, and Vermont. Programs are being planned for Washington and  New York.

PaintCare programs are funded by a fee (another name for a tax) on the sale of each container of paint sold in the state or jurisdiction. Fees are based on container size and vary by state. The assessment of fees covers costs associated with setting up drop-off locations for post-consumer architectural coatings (includes paint, stain, and varnish) from households and businesses in each state with a program and operating recycling and re-use systems. Most drop-off locations are paint retailers. PaintCare also works with household hazardous waste programs and solid waste transfer stations to cover expenses related to paint transportation, recycling, and disposal of the paint they accept. There is no charge for dropping off paint at a PaintCare location. All sites accept all brands of paint, regardless of how old the paint is.

Awards and Recognitions 
In 2016 PaintCare received the Bow&Arrow Award for Service and Take-Back by the California Product Stewardship Council.

In 2018 PaintCare received the Environmental Sustainability Leadership Award by the Northeast Recycling Council for its excellence in advancing product stewardship.

References

Paints
Recycling in the United States
501(c)(3) organizations
Non-profit organizations based in Washington, D.C.
Recycling organizations